Sparklers is a cooking competition show produced by SOMM TV. It was nominated for a James Beard Award in 2022.

References

American cooking television series